Enyo is a genus of moths in the family Sphingidae. The genus was erected by Jacob Hübner in 1819.

Species
Enyo bathus (Rothschild, 1904)
Enyo boisduvali (Oberthur, 1904)
Enyo cavifer (Rothschild & Jordan, 1903)
Enyo gorgon (Cramer, 1777)
Enyo latipennis (Rothschild & Jordan, 1903)
Enyo lugubris (Linnaeus, 1771)
Enyo ocypete (Linnaeus, 1758)
Enyo taedium Schaus, 1890

References

 
Dilophonotini
Moth genera
Taxa named by Jacob Hübner